The 1987 Nabisco Grand Prix was the only tennis circuit held that year. It incorporated the four grand slam tournaments, three World Championship Tennis tournaments and the Grand Prix tournaments.

Schedule 
The table below shows the 1987 Nabisco Grand Prix schedule (a forerunner to the ATP Tour).

Key

January

February

March

April

May

June

July

August

September

October

November

December

Grand Prix rankings

List of tournament winners 
The list of winners and number of Grand Prix singles titles won, alphabetically by last name:
  Andre Agassi (1) Itaparica
  Boris Becker (3) Indian Wells, Milan, Queen's Club
  Kent Carlsson (2) Nice, Bologna
  Pat Cash (3) Nancy, Wimbledon, Johannesburg
  Andrei Chesnokov (1) Florence
  Stefan Edberg (7) Australian Open, Memphis, Rotterdam, Tokyo Outdoor, Cincinnati, Tokyo Indoor, Stockholm
  Kelly Evernden (2) Bristol, Brisbane
  Brad Gilbert (1) Scottsdale
  Dan Goldie (1) Newport
  Andrés Gómez (1) Forest Hills
  Jim Grabb (1) Seoul
  Martín Jaite (1) Palermo
  Johan Kriek (1) Livingston
  Ivan Lendl (8) Hamburg, French Open, Washington D.C., Montreal, US Open, Sydney Indoor, Wembley, Masters
  Peter Lundgren (2) Rye Brook, San Francisco
  Amos Mansdorf (1) Tel Aviv
  Wally Masur (1) Adelaide
  Luiz Mattar (1) Guarujá
  Tim Mayotte (5) Philadelphia, Chicago, Toulouse, Bercy, Frankfurt
  Miloslav Mečíř (6) Auckland, Sydney Outdoor, Key Biscayne, Dallas WCT, Stuttgart Outdoor, Hilversum
  Claudio Mezzadri (1) Geneva
  Yannick Noah (2) Lyon, Basel
  Joakim Nyström (1) Båstad
  Guillermo Pérez Roldán (3) Munich, Athens, Buenos Aires
  Claudio Pistolesi (1) Bari
  Pedro Rebolledo (1) St. Vincent
  Emilio Sánchez (4) Gstaad, Bordeaux, Kitzbühel, Madrid
  Jonas Svensson (1) Vienna
  Eliot Teltscher (1) Hong Kong
  Marián Vajda (1) Prague
  Christo van Rensburg (1) Orlando
  Mats Wilander (5) Brussels, Monte Carlo, Rome, Boston, Indianapolis
  Jaime Yzaga (2) Schenectady, São Paulo

The following players won their first title in 1987:
  Andre Agassi Itaparica
  Andrei Chesnokov Florence
  Kelly Evernden Bristol
  Dan Goldie Newport
  Jim Grabb Seoul
  Luiz Mattar Guarujá
  Claudio Mezzadri Geneva
  Claudio Pistolesi Bari
  Marián Vajda Prague
  Christo van Rensburg Orlando
  Jaime Yzaga Schenectady

See also 
 1987 Virginia Slims World Championship Series

References 
 ATP Archive 1987: Nabisco Grand Prix Tournaments:Accessed 22 October 2010.
 History Mens Professional Tours:Accessed 22 October 2010.

Further reading 
 

 
Grand Prix
Grand Prix tennis circuit seasons